Duncan Urquhart (18 August 1908 – 28 April 1956) was a Scottish footballer, who played for Hibernian, Aberdeen, Barrow, and Waterford. Urquhart represented Scotland once, in a 1934 British Home Championship match against Wales.

Career 
Urquhart, a "tough tackler" from Newton Stewart, was signed by Hibs during the 1929–30 season. Urquhart was part of the side as Hibs were relegated the following season, but then gained promotion back to the top flight in 1933. He won his only cap for Scotland later that year, but was released by Hibs in 1935 after a heavy Edinburgh derby defeat by Hearts; Urquhart then signed for Aberdeen. In September 1939 Urquhart was signed by Waterford and during his time there was also selected once for the League of Ireland XI.

Personal life 
In 1956, Urquhart died in Edinburgh, Scotland at the age of 47.

References

1908 births
1956 deaths
Footballers from Edinburgh
Association football defenders
Scottish footballers
Scotland international footballers
Hibernian F.C. players
Aberdeen F.C. players
Scottish Football League players
Scottish Junior Football Association players
Newtongrange Star F.C. players
Barrow A.F.C. players